The 1980 Leeds City Council election took place on 1 May 1980 to elect members of Leeds City Council in England.

A full boundary review of Leeds's electoral wards increased the number of wards from 32 to 33, also increasing the number of councillors from 96 to 99. This prompted the entire council needing to be elected.

Boundary changes
The boundary changes added an extra ward to the existing 32 - increasing the councillor total by three to 99 - with just half the ward names surviving the changes:

Abolished:
 Armley and Castleton
 Beeston and Holbeck
 Burley
 Burmantofts and Richmond Hill
 Chapel Allerton and Scott Hall
 City and Woodhouse
 Cookridge and Weetwood
 Garforth North and Barwick
 Kippax and Swillington
 Gipton and Whinmoor
 Harehills and Roundhay
 Hunslet East and West
 Osmondthorpe
 Otley 
 Stanningley
 Talbot

Created: 
 Armley
 Barwick & Kippax
 Beeston
 Burmantofts
 Chapel Allerton
 City & Holbeck
 Cookridge
 Garforth & Swillington
 Harehills
 Hunslet
 North
 Otley & Wharfedale
 Richmond Hill
 Roundhay
 University
 Weetwood
 Whinmoor

Election result
The drop in Conservative support - which seen them set lows in vote share and seats won - allowed Labour to win record representation and comfortably regain control of the council from the Conservatives, with a 25-seat strong majority. Labour also managed highs in votes and vote share, once the previous year's totals are omitted for unrepresentatively high turnout (which were gained from coinciding with the general election that year).

The Liberals, who fielded their first full-slate of candidates, also achieved party records but were rewarded with fewer seats in the new landscape; their gains confined to Armley, Horsforth and Otley, looking unlikely to win the new seats replacing the formerly favourable seats for Hunslet and Pudsey.

Elsewhere, the Ecologists bettered their previous efforts with an increased outing, standing candidates in over a half of the wards, surpassing Liberal support in a number of them. Beyond the regular Communist slate, there was also another appearance from an Independent in Morley North, an Independent Liberal standing in Rothwell and the first appearance of a Residents Association by way of a candidate each in Headingley, Kirkstall and Weetwood.

This result has the following consequences for the total number of seats on the council after the elections:

Ward results

References

1980 English local elections
1980
1980s in Leeds